Bill Ewing (28 May 1909 – 12 February 1994) was an Australian rules footballer who played with Essendon in the Victorian Football League (VFL).

Notes

External links 

1909 births
1994 deaths
Australian rules footballers from Victoria (Australia)
Essendon Football Club players
South Bendigo Football Club players